Joseph Julian Oste (March 28, 1893 – January 19, 1971) was a Belgian Catholic priest, missionary, and Bishop of the Roman Catholic Diocese of Jehol between 1948 and 1971.

Biography
Joseph Julian Oste was born in Zele, Flemish Region, Belgium, on March 28, 1893. He joined the CICM Missionaries in 1912. He was ordained a priest on November 21, 1920. He came to China to preach in 1921. After Louis Janssens's resignation, he was appointed Bishop of the Roman Catholic Diocese of Jehol. He was consecrated on October 28.

In December 1953, the Communist government expelled him from China, he arrived in British Hong Kong by a cruise ship from Tianjin and preached there for 17 years. He returned to Belgium in 1970. 

On January 19, 1971, he died of leukemia, aged 77.

References

1893 births
1971 deaths
People from Zele
20th-century Belgian Roman Catholic priests
20th-century Roman Catholic bishops in China